The Chilean National Museum of Natural History ( or ) is one of three national museums in Chile, along with the Museum of Fine Arts and the National History Museum. It is located in Quinta Normal Park. Founded on September 14, 1830 by the French naturalist Claudio Gay, the director of the Museum and the Botanical garden was another Frenchman Jean-François Dauxion-Lavaysse.

History
The museum is one of the oldest natural history museums in South America. It was founded on September 14, 1830 by the French naturalist Claudio Gay, commissioned by the Chilean government. Its first director was another Frenchman Jean-François Dauxion-Lavaysse.Its original mandate was the biology and geography of Chile, with a concentration on crops and mineral resources. The current building was constructed in 1875 as a palace, or pavilion, for the Chilean International Exhibition.

In 1889 departments of botany, zoology, and mineralogy were established. The National Museum Bulletin (Boletín del Museo Nacional) was first published in 1908, and continues today under the title Bulletin of the National Museum of Natural History (Boletín del Museo Nacional de Historia Natural).

Earthquakes in August 1906 and April 1927 have damaged the museum.

Humberto Fuenzalida was director of the museum until Grete Mostny became director in 1964. She led the museum until 1982.

Exhibits and collections

The museum currently has twelve permanent exhibits:

Biogeography of Chile, a long tunnel that fills much of the first floor
Interactive children's games for terrestrial ecosystems
The Central Hall exhibits, including a 17-meter skeleton of a sei whale
Minerals, with an emphasis on the nitrate boom of the early twentieth century.
Insects, including large fossil dragonflies
Mollusks
Mesozoic era vertebrates, including a specimen of Carnotaurus sastrei
Chilean timber
Chilean archaeology
Juan Fernández Islands
Cultural anthropology, covering the Aymara, Mapuche, Selk'nam, Rapanui, Kaweskar, and Yámana. The museum houses the finest public collection of rongorongo artifacts in the world.
The uses of copper, a collection of Codelco, the state mining corporation

The oldest mummies in the world are found in the museum, being around 7400 years old (2000 years older than their Egyptian counterparts). Fifteen of them were put into a CAT scan in late 2016. Scientists hope to learn more about the mummification process used by the Chinchorro people of Chile. The 15 mummies were women and children and scientists note that different preservation techniques were used.

A collection of molluscs from Chile and other parts of the world is present in the museum. The collection has been assembled since the beginning of the study of the natural history of Chile. Juan I. Molina collected 11 species of molluscs in 1782. French zoologists published studies of the molluscs in Chile in the 1800s. In 1853, Rodulfo A. Philippi (a German doctor) was hired as a naturalist by the Chilean government and was appointed director and curator of the Museum. As of 2003, the mollusc collection was being organized and catalogued, taking into account various donations and exchanges made by Philippi until the end of his term in 1897. Philippi's son Federico Philippi served as director of the museum from 1897 to 1910. Medical doctor Eduardo Moore was director from 1910 to 1927. Civil engineer Ricardo Latcham served as director from 1928 to 1943. Naturalist Enrique Gigoux was director from 1943 to 1948. Geologist Humberto Fuenzalida was director from 1949 to 1963; his tenure was marked by a grand expansion at the museum, with the formation of the malacology laboratory under tutelage of professor Nibaldo Bahamonde.

Marine fossils from the late Miocene and the early Pliocene were quarried from marine sandstone deposits on the north-central coast of Chile in the early 1990s and added to the museum's collection shortly thereafter.

Departments and oversight
The five departments are botany, zoology, entomology, anthropology, and paleontology. The department of botany includes a herbarium of 3700 species dating from 1830. 90% of the type specimens of Chilean species are housed here. The zoology department contains fourteen holotypes, mainly Chilean marine and freshwater fish. The anthropological department emphasizes the archeology of Central Chile through the Inca Empire and cultural artifacts of modern or recently extinct peoples of Chile and Easter Island. One of its duties is the caretaking of the Plomo Mummy.

The Museum is overseen by the Director of the National Cultural Heritage Service, itself a division of the Chilean Ministry of Cultures, Arts, and Heritage.

References

External links
A 360° panorama of the museum

Museums established in 1830
Museums in Santiago, Chile
Natural history museums in Chile
1830 establishments in Chile
World's fair architecture in South America
1822 in Chilean law